Pilota (Catalan and Basque for ball) may refer to:
 Valencian pilota, a traditional handball ball game played in Valencia, Spain
 Basque pilota, ball games played in Basque Country, Spain
 Pilota (food), a large meatball used in a traditional Catalan meat and vegetable stew